SugoiCon was an annual three day anime convention in the Cincinnati–Northern Kentucky metropolitan area held at the Crowne Plaza Cincinnati North in Sharonville, Ohio. The convention was organized by Southwest Ohio Regional Animation.

Programming
The convention typically featured an anime music video contest, concerts, costume contest, dealers room, game shows, guest panels, karaoke, masquerade, rave, video rooms, and workshops. Due to scheduling problems, the 2014 event was cancelled.

History

Event history

References

Other Related News Articles
 
 
 

Defunct anime conventions
Recurring events established in 2000
Recurring events disestablished in 2013
2000 establishments in Kentucky
Annual events in the United States
Festivals in Cincinnati